Stomopneustoida is an order of echinoderms belonging to the class Echinoidea.

Families:
 Glyptocidaridae
 Stomechinidae
 Stomopneustidae

References

Echinoidea
Echinoderm orders